Old Joe may refer to:

People, real or fictional

 Joseph Stalin, (1879–1953) Communist dictator of the USSR from 1929 until his death in 1953
 Old Joe (Breaking Bad), a character in the TV series Breaking Bad
 Old Joe, a character portrayed by Bruce Willis in the 2012 Looper (film)
 Old Joe, a minor character in A Christmas Carol who buys the belongings of the deceased Scrooge

Other uses
 Old Joe (Norfork, Arkansas), rock art panel listed on the U.S. National Register of Historic Places in Arkansas
 Old Joe Clark, a folk song
 10515 Old Joe, an asteroid
 Joe Camel, a former advertising mascot for Camel cigarettes
 Joseph Chamberlain Memorial Clock Tower at the University of Birmingham, England

See also
Poor Joe (disambiguation)